Megachile inyoensis is a species of bee in the family Megachilidae. It was described by Mitchell in 1942.

References

Inyoensis
Insects described in 1942